"Free" is a song by American singer Deniece Williams that was included on her album This Is Niecy. The song was written by Williams, Hank Redd, Nathan Watts and Susaye Greene and produced by Maurice White and Charles Stepney.

"Free" was Williams' breakthrough single reaching  2 on the US Billboard Hot Soul Singles chart and No. 25 on the Billboard Hot 100. The single also rose to No. 1 on the UK Singles Chart for two weeks in May 1977.

Covers and samples
 Williams's own niece Shatasha Williams (vocalist on Bone Thugs N Harmony's "Thuggish Ruggish Bone") covered the song.
 Zhané performed the song as guest stars on the New York Undercover episode "Mama Said Knock You Out".
 Polish jazz musician Michał Urbaniak covered the song in Ecstasy (1978).
 Billy MacKenzie covered the song in 1991, on B.E.F.'s Music of Quality and Distinction Volume Two.
 Chanté Moore recorded "Free" for her 1994 album A Love Supreme, with a sampling of "Sail On" from the Commodores.
Mic Geronimo sampled "Free" for his song "Shit's Real" in 1994.
 Debelah Morgan recorded an upbeat version of this song for her debut album Debelah in 1994.
 Twinz sampled the song in 1996, for their song Eastside LB
 In 1998, M-Doc's version of the song recorded for his album Young, Black, Rich and Famous and released as the lead single charted at number sixty-one on the U.S. Hot R&B/Hip-Hop Singles.
 Towa Tei produced a track called "Free" heavily based on the song in 2002.
 Juanita Dailey covered the song from her first and only album of the same title, released in 1998.
 In 2002, En Vogue performed the song on their concert DVD, Live in the USA.
 Mariah Carey sampled "Free" on Fly Like A Bird, from her 2005 album, The Emancipation Of Mimi.
 Bassist Marcus Miller recorded "Free" for his 2007 album of the same name. Corinne Bailey Rae provided lead vocals.
 Seal recorded this song for his 2008 album Soul.
 Bebi Dol recorded this song for her cover album Čovek rado izvan sebe živi.
 DJ Nate used loops from the song for his Juke-track "Free" on the 2010 album Da Trak Genious.
 Will Downing covered "Free" on his self-titled debut album in 1988.
 In 2012, Skye Townsend, an independent R&B-soul and Pop artist covered and performed the song as a spoken-word poem featuring Wyann Vaughn. The song was featured on her debut EP album, Vomit.

 UK singer Max Marshall covered the song in 2014, titled "Be Free".
 The Pale Fountains covered the song in 1983 and it appears on their album "Longshot For Your Love"
 English Soul-tronica band Queen's Troubadour did a remake of Williams' song titled "Free '14"
 Walter Beasley covered the song on his 2007 album "Ready for Love".
 Akiko Matsuda from Japanese band Ramjet Pulley covered the song on cover album "Giza studio R&B Respect Vol.1: Six sisters selection".
 Gospel entertainer Kirk Franklin used a sample of "Free" in his song "Why?" featuring Stevie Wonder from his album Hero.
 Althea Rene covered the song for her 2013 album In the Flow.
 Rapsody sampled this song on "Afeni" for her album Eve in 2019.
 Nakatomi (group), a happy hardcore dance act, covered the song in 1995 which peaked at number 17 in the Dutch charts of that same year.

Charts

Weekly charts

Year-end charts

Certifications

References

1976 singles
1976 songs
Chanté Moore songs
Columbia Records singles
Deniece Williams songs
Song recordings produced by Maurice White
Songs written by Deniece Williams
Songs written by Nathan Watts
Songs written by Susaye Greene
UK Singles Chart number-one singles